Baldwin Senior High School is a 9-12 secondary school in Baldwin, Michigan.

Academics
The Baldwin community has created the "Baldwin Promise" that provides full tuition for graduates to attend college in Michigan. The Baldwin Promise program is the subject of an Upstanders film.

Demographics
The demographic breakdown of the 148 students enrolled in 2014-15 was:
Male - 55%
Female - 45%
Native American/Alaskan - 2%
Asian/Pacific Islanders - 0%
Black - 34%
Hispanic - 3%
White - 55%
Multiracial - 6%

94% of the students were eligible for free or reduced lunch.

Athletics
Baldwin's Panthers compete in the West Michigan 'D' League. The school colors are blue and gold.  The following MHSAA sanctioned sports are offered:

Baseball (boys)
Basketball (girls and boys)
Bowling (girls and boys)
Cross country (girls and boys)
Football (boys)
Softball (girls)
Track and field (girls and boys)
Volleyball (girls)

References

Public high schools in Michigan
Education in Lake County, Michigan